Grace and Frankie is an American comedy television series, which premiered on Netflix on May 8, 2015. The series was created by Marta Kauffman and Howard J. Morris, and stars Jane Fonda and Lily Tomlin as Grace and Frankie, two women whose lives are turned upside down when their husbands announce they are in love with each other and want to get married. The series also stars Sam Waterston, Martin Sheen, Brooklyn Decker, Ethan Embry, June Diane Raphael, and Baron Vaughn in supporting roles.

On September 4, 2019, Grace and Frankie was renewed for a seventh and final season of 16 episodes.

Series overview

Episodes

Season 1 (2015)

Season 2 (2016)

Season 3 (2017)

Season 4 (2018)

Season 5 (2019)

Season 6 (2020)

Season 7 (2021–22)

References

External links
 

Lists of American comedy-drama television series episodes
Lists of American sitcom episodes